Bente Kraus (born 21 February 1989) is a German speed skater. She finished seventh in the women's 5000 metres event and eighth in the women's 3000 metres event at the 2013 World Single Distance Championships. She also had attended the 2014 Sochi Olympics where she received no medals.

References

External links 
 
 
 
 

1989 births
Living people
German female speed skaters
Olympic speed skaters of Germany
Speed skaters at the 2014 Winter Olympics
Speed skaters from Berlin